The Babymetal World Tour 2014 (stylized in all caps) was the first worldwide concert tour by Japanese band Babymetal. Supporting their eponymous debut album, the tour ran from 23 June 2014 to 20 December 2014, taking place in Japan, the United States, Canada, and several countries in Europe.

Background 
On 2 March 2014, at the end of the band's second show at Nippon Budokan, two European shows, Legend "Y" and Legend "M" were announced; these shows, taking place in Paris, France and Cologne, Germany, respectively served as the 15th birthday celebrations for Yuimetal and Moametal, respectively.

The world tour was confirmed on 7 May 2014 with a trailer and several dates announced for European and Japanese legs, marking the second episode of the Metal Resistance. One of the dates included an appearance at Sonisphere Festival in the United Kingdom on 5 July 2014; Alan Day, of the Kilimanjaro Live group (Sonisphere's event promoter), formally invited the band to play in the festival following a successful fan-driven campaign entitled "Babymetal For Sonisphere UK 2014", which Sonisphere later acknowledged on its website. Initially scheduled to play on 6 June at the tent at Bohemia Stage, the performance was moved to 5 June in order to upgrade to the Apollo Main Stage. The next show in the country was set to occur at the Electric Ballroom in London, but was later moved to The Forum due to tickets quickly selling out. On 1 June 2014, a tour date for the United States was revealed.

On the tour, the band performed as an opening act for five shows from Lady Gaga's ArtRave: The Artpop Ball tour, from 30 July 2014 to 6 August 2014,
and also made appearances at Heavy Montréal in Canada on 9 August 2014, and Summer Sonic Festival 2014 in Japan on 16 August and 17 August 2014.

After their performance at Summer Sonic in Chiba on 16 August 2014, another leg, titled the Babymetal Back to the USA / UK Tour 2014 (stylized in all caps), was added to the tour, adding dates in November 2014, with the USA concert was to be held in Hammerstein Ballroom in New York City on 4 November, and the UK performance held in O2 Academy Brixton in London on 8 November, which would mark the start of the third episode of the Metal Resistance. On 13 September 2014, Babymetal announced the show Legend "2015": New Year Fox Festival to be held at Saitama Super Arena, Japan on 10 January 2015, after the end of the tour.

In addition to official tour dates, the band also performed secret dates, with the umbrella term "Apocrypha". Knowledge of these performances is generally restricted to members of the "Babymetal Apocalypse Web" official fanclub. The text supplied marked the first time the term "The One" was used by the band; in this instance it referred to a secret society present since the performance Legend "I".

Broadcast and recording
On 13 June 2014, the band announced a live screening of the 7 July concert in London at The Forum to be held at Zepp Tokyo. A live video album of the tour titled Live in London: Babymetal World Tour 2014 was released in Japan on 20 May 2015, and in Europe on 30 October 2015, while highlights from the show made an appearance on the box set Babymetal World Tour 2014 Apocalypse.

Set list
This setlist is representative of the show in Paris, France. It does not represent all dates throughout the tour.
 "Babymetal Death"
 "Iine!" 
 "Uki Uki ★ Midnight" 
 "Mischiefs of Metal Gods"
 "Rondo of Nightmare" 
 "Onedari Daisakusen" 
 "Catch Me If You Can"
 "Akatsuki" 
 "Song 4" 
 "Megitsune" 
 "Doki Doki ☆ Morning" 
 "Gimme Chocolate!!" 
 "Headbangeeeeerrrrr!!!!!"  (featuring Yuimetal)
 "Ijime, Dame, Zettai"

Tour dates

Babymetal World Tour 2014 Apocalypse 

On 20 May 2015, the band released the video album Live in London: Babymetal World Tour 2014, containing footage from both solo shows performed in London. Babymetal World Tour 2014 Apocalypse is a member-exclusive box set that was released simultaneously to "The One" fanclub members, containing content of the same shows, as well as other moments of the world tour, including a performance at Makuhari Messe. The latter performance has since been released in vinyl format to commemorate the band's tenth anniversary.

Content 
The box set includes a photo-book of various shows from the Babymetal World Tour 2014 with photography by Dana Distortion (outside Japan) and Miyaaki Shingo (in Japan), a Blu-ray and CD release of Live in London, and a bonus Blu-ray titled "Babymetal World Tour 2014 Apocalypse" containing the second headlining show in Chiba, Japan at Makuhari Messe on 14 September 2014, and performance highlights throughout the rest of the tour. Taking place at the final venue in Japan, a total of 17,000 people attended the two shows. During the performance, the band announced a show set to take place at Saitama Super Arena on 10 January 2015.

Track listing 

Notes
 "Mischiefs of Metal Gods" is only listed as a track on the CD format of Live in London.
 The audio 4-CD set for Live in London splits each performance between tracks 7 and 8 for each show.
 The vinyl release consists only of the 14 tracks from disc two for 14 September Makuhari Messe, split into two LPs.

Notes

References

External links
 Official Babymetal website

2014 concert tours
Babymetal concert tours
Concert tours of North America
Concert tours of the United States
Concert tours of Canada
Concert tours of Europe
Concert tours of the United Kingdom
Concert tours of France
Concert tours of Germany
Concert tours of Asia
Concert tours of Japan